Delvin "Pen" Cayetano MBE (born 1954 in Dangriga Town, Stann Creek District, Belize) is a Belizean artist and musician.

Biography 
Cayetano is self-taught in the art of painting and music and claims his influences come from the native Garifuna culture and that of the Creoles. These are the two largest ethnically black groups in Belize.

Cayetano began painting in the late 1970s at a studio in Dangriga. He remained in Dangriga until 1990, when he moved to Germany. He has showcased all over the world and become one of Belize's foremost cultural ambassadors. He and his German wife, Ingrid, returned to Dangriga in July 2009 and they opened the Pen Cayetano Studio Gallery 1 in August 2009.

Cayetano is currently married with three children (Malí, Beni, and Ibo). His family band, "The Cayetanos", carry on their father's musical traditions.

Cayetano was appointed a Member of the Order of the British Empire in the 2013 New Year Honours.

Contributions to punta rock 
Pen Cayetano, with his Turtle Shell Band, invented punta rock by introducing the turtle shell and electric instruments to Punta, creating a new music genre that has become popular with Garifuna artists.

According to Cayetano, the origins of punta rock came when he observed some younger fellows being rude at a ceremony to honor Garifuna pioneer Thomas Vincent Ramos in 1978 (Ramos had convinced the government of Belize to celebrate Garifuna Settlement Day in honor of the arrival of the group to Belize in 1802 and 1832). They were singing songs in Garifuna with a worldly rhythm. Cayetano built on that foundation to create the "Turtle Shell Band" in 1979. Early band members included solo star Mohobub Flores and Peter "Poots" Flores (no relation). The band built its reputation in and around Dangriga until 1982, when it held its first performances in Belmopan and Belize City. Eventually the band appearance on Radio Belize and other groups picked up the sound. Cayetano continues to record and was awarded by the National Institute of Culture and History for his achievements in 2003.

References

External links 
 
 Pen on Punta Rock-UWI Cavehill
 Reviews of Pen's music by Rootsworld
 Local TV station announcing exhibition by Pen and wife Ingrid in 2006
Family, Creative Fulfillment, and Some Funk: the Artful Life of Garifuna Marvel Pen Cayetano and His Clan

1954 births
Living people
Belizean artists
Belizean musicians
Garifuna people
Indigenous painters of the Americas
Members of the Order of the British Empire
People from Dangriga